Sirmauri is a Western Pahari language spoken in the Sirmaur district in the northern Indian state of Himachal Pradesh. Its two main varieties are Dharthi (also called Giriwari) and Giripari.

Grammar

Postpositions

Script 
The native script of the language is called Sirmauri script. This script is under proposal to be encoded in the Unicode. It is locally known as Dhankari. Pabuuchi was a script used by a class of astrologers.

Status 
The language is commonly called Pahari or Himachali. The language has no official status and is recorded as a dialect of Hindi. According to the United Nations Education, Scientific and Cultural Organisation (UNESCO), the language is in the critically endangered category, i.e. the youngest speakers of Sirmauri are generally grandparents or older and they too speak it infrequently or partially. Earlier the language enjoyed some state patronage. After independence, everything changed due to the government favoring Hindi more.

The demand for the inclusion of 'Pahari (Himachali)' under the Eight Schedule of the Constitution, which is supposed to represent multiple Pahari languages of Himachal Pradesh, had been made in the year 2010 by the state's Vidhan Sabha. There has been no positive progress on this matter since then even when small organisations strive to save the language. Due to political interest, the language is currently recorded as a dialect of Hindi, even when having poor mutual intelligibility with it.

References

Northern Indo-Aryan languages
Indo-Aryan languages
Languages of Himachal Pradesh
Endangered languages of India